Tamar Pelleg-Sryck (born; 2 June 1926) is an Israeli lawyer (R) and human rights activist. She is known for the help of Palestinian detainees.

Award
 Emil Grunzweig Human Rights Award (2011) - lifetime achievement award

References

Living people
1926 births
Israeli lawyers
Israeli human rights activists
Women human rights activists